The Cabinet of the Government of Jamaica is the ultimate decision-making body of the executive within the Westminster system of government in traditional constitutional theory. The Cabinet of Jamaica is the principal instrument of government policy. It consists of the Prime Minister, and a minimum of thirteen other Ministers of Government, who must be members of one of the two Houses of Parliament. Not more than four members of the Cabinet may be members of the Senate. The Minister of Finance must be an elected member of the House of Representatives. The Shadow Cabinet of Jamaica is seen as the alternative to the Cabinet of Jamaica, led by the Leader of the Opposition (Jamaica), and is charged with fairly criticizing and providing alternative policy to that proposed by the Government.

The Cabinet of Jamaica is currently composed of The Jamaica Labour Party members because the party won the 2020 General elections.

The following are the members of the Government Cabinet led by Prime Minister Andrew Holness.

Composition

King-in-Council 
The government of Jamaica, formally referred to as His Majesty's Jamaican Government, is defined by the constitution as the King acting on the advice of her Executive Council; what is technically known as the King-in-Council, or sometimes the Governor-in-Council, referring to the governor general as the King's representative.

As the stipulations of responsible government require that those who directly advise the monarch and governor general on how to exercise the Royal Prerogative be accountable to the elected House of Representatives, the day-to-day operation of government is guided only by a sub-group of the Cabinet made up of individuals who hold seats in parliament. This body of ministers of the Crown is the Cabinet, which has come to be the council in the phrase King-in-Council.

Ministers, Ministers of State, Ministers without Portfolio, and Parliamentary Secretary 
Each minister of the Crown is responsible for the general administration of at least one government portfolio, and heads a corresponding ministry or ministries. The most important minister, following the prime minister, is the Minister of Finance, while other high-profile ministries include foreign affairs, national security, industry and health.

Further, the prime minister may recommend the governor general appoint to Cabinet some ministers of state and ministers without portfolio. Ministers of state often assume one responsibility of a ministry and are not considered as a part of the Cabinet. In the Jamaican press, Ministers of State of often referred to as Junior Ministers. Ministers without portfolio, often working within the Office of the prime minister, assuming one of the prime minister's subsidiary roles (excluding that of Minister of Defence). One exception exists within the current Cabinet.

Ministers of Second Administration

Ministers without Portfolio

Ministers of State 
Nine ministers of state have been appointed but are not a part of the cabinet although they will help in the operations of their various sectors.

Parliamentary Secretary

See also
Politics of Jamaica
Governor-General of Jamaica
Prime Minister of Jamaica
Shadow Cabinet of Jamaica

References

Jamaica
Politics of Jamaica
Lists of Jamaican politicians
Jamaica